"Die a Little Bit" is a song recorded by American singer Tinashe featuring guest vocals from British rapper Ms Banks. It was produced by Trackside and written by Ms Banks, Rook Monroe and Tinashe. It was released commercially for digital download and streaming via Tinashe's new independent label, Tinashe Music Inc. on October 24, 2019, as the first single from Tinashe's fourth studio album, Songs for You.

A remix with producer Zhu was released on July 3, 2020.

Composition
The song has been described as electropop and UK rap over a throwback '90s house beat with breathy vocals and minimal production. It has also been compared to her previous work from the mixtapes Reverie and Black Water.

Music video
The music video for "Die a Little Bit" was released the same day as the single's release. "Flanked by party-ready dancers in a dimly lit room, Tinashe shows in the "Die a Little Bit" video that her choreography is still as impressive as ever, and only further cement her status as an artist that should never be underestimated."

References

2019 singles
2019 songs
Tinashe songs
Songs written by Tinashe